The European Parliament election of 2019 took place in Italy on 26 May 2019.

In Veneto Lega Nord came first with 49.9% of the vote (country-level result 34.3%) and more than 20pp than the Democratic Party, which came second with 18.9%. The Five Star Movement came third with 8.9%, ahead of Brothers of Italy (6.8%), Forza Italia (6.1%), Green Europe (2.7%), More Europe (2.7%) and The Left (1.1%).

Results

References

Elections in Veneto
European Parliament elections in Italy
2019 European Parliament election
2019 elections in Italy